John the Revelator (John of Patmos) is the traditional author of the Book of Revelation, the final book of the New Testament.

John the Revelator may also refer to:

"John the Revelator" (song), a 1930 traditional American folk song
"John the Revelator / Lilian", a 2006 single by Depeche Mode
"JTR" (song), a Dave Matthews Band song based on an earlier song by the band called "John the Revelator" (different from the American folk song)